Saša Dobrić (born 24 January 1982) is a Serbian football player who last played for Dolina Padina.

Born in Benkovac (SR Croatia, SFR Yugoslavia), he started playing in a local club NK Velebit in 1992.  In 1995, he moved to Serbia and joined the youth team of FK Vojvodina where he will play almost continuously until 2008.

He was part of the FR Yugoslavia U-21 team.

References

External links
 Saša Dobrić at playmakerstats.com (English version of ogol.com.br)

1982 births
Living people
People from Benkovac
Serbs of Croatia
Serbian footballers
Association football midfielders
FK Vojvodina players
FK Rudar Ugljevik players
FK Veternik players
FK Kabel players
FK Proleter Zrenjanin players
Degerfors IF players
FC Trollhättan players
FK ČSK Čelarevo players
FK BSK Borča players
Vasas SC players
FC Vostok players
Egri FC players
Serbian expatriate footballers
Expatriate footballers in Sweden
Expatriate footballers in Hungary
Expatriate footballers in Kazakhstan
Serbian expatriate sportspeople in Sweden
Serbian expatriate sportspeople in Hungary
Serbian expatriate sportspeople in Kazakhstan